Henosepilachna sumbana, known commonly as the cucurbit ladybird, and sometimes listed as Henosepilachna cucurbitae is a pest ladybird species. H. sumbana feeds on cucurbits; vine-growing fruits such as melons, pumpkins, gourds, and cucumbers.

References

Coccinellidae
Beetles described in 1959